Chabanne et partenaires (English: Chabanne and Partners), also known as Agence Chabanne, is an architectural and engineering firm based in Lyon, Rhône, France. Billed as France's fourth largest architectural firm by revenue, it is one of the country's usual candidates for public building contracts, submitting around 80 such tenders a year nationwide and abroad. Thus, the scope of the agency's work has remained wide, with only a loose specialization in sports, education and healthcare facilities that are typical of the market.

History
Jean Chabanne (1946 – 2020), an alumn of the École des Beaux-Arts in Paris, founded his first architectural practice Ateliers Chabanne in 1969. Originally from Loire, Chabanne grew his business in Paris. In 1999, he acquired office space in Lyon and relaunched his practice as Chabanne et partenaires, a hybrid firm housing both architecture and engineering specialists.

The agency has antennas in Paris, Aix-en-Provence and Saint-Etienne. It has also maintained offices in Montpellier and Geneva, Switzerland in the past.
Jean Chabanne's son Nicolas (born 1974) succeeded him at the head of the practice in 2011.

Selected works
Below is a selected list of works by Jean Chabanne, Nicolas Chabanne and their associated agencies:
 Edmond Nocard Building at National Veterinary School in Alfort
Angers IceParc
Centre aquatique d'Aubervilliers (2024)
Stade nautique Bordeaux Métropole in Mérignac (2022)
Palais des sports de Caen (2023)
Aren'Ice in Cergy
Halle Stéphane-Diagana in Lyon
Terminal 1 at Lyon–Saint-Exupéry Airport (with Rogers Stirk Harbour + Partners)
Palais omnisports Marseille Grand-Est
Aquarium Mare Nostrum at Planet Ocean in Montpellier
Campus Diagana Sport-Santé in Mougins
Palais des congrès de Nîmes (2025)
Robert-Poirier Stadium at Rennes 2 University
Grand Palais Éphémère in Paris (engineering)
Piscine Yvonne-Godard in Paris
Vélodrome National de Saint-Quentin-en-Yvelines
SIG Arena in Strasbourg (2024)
Palais des sports Jauréguiberry in Toulon
Stade de l'Aube in Troyes (2004 redevelopment)
Cité des congrès in Valenciennes

References

Bibliography

External links 
 
 Chabanne on YouTube

Architecture firms of France
Companies based in Lyon